The 2018 Kenya handshake was a political truce made on 9 March 2018 between the then Kenyan President, Uhuru Kenyatta and former Kenyan Prime Minister, Raila Odinga. The two had been the leaders of opposing political factions amidst widespread political violence and civil unrest, and they had faced one another in the contested 2017 Kenyan general election. Under the "handshake" agreement, both figures agreed to end their political feud.

Background information 

Historically, Kenya has been characterized by divisive politics rising from periodical general elections allegedly marred by rigging and subsequent politically motivated violence. Kenya has an extensive record of ethnically mobilized political violence and the exacerbation of militias supported by politicians. Kenya's tribal war traces back to Jaramogi Oginga Odinga, where parties were formed based on one's tribe. Detrimental effects of the disputed general elections have been witnessed since 1997, when Kenya's ruling party, Kenya African National Unity (KANU) unleashed terror in order to coerce the citizens and  forge a way forward in their devolution agenda.

The Digo Community was mobilized to fight against the people of the Western and Central parts of Kenya. This resulted in the displacement of more than 10,000 people and the death of 104 innocent civilians. Reports from the judiciary indicated the existence of vigilante groups funding the then-ruling party led by Daniel arap Moi. Key among them was Jeshi La Mzee. There was a resurgence of conflict between the Kikuyu and the Kalenjin that persisted until 2013. In 2002, the National Rainbow Coalition, led by Mwai Kibaki, established peace in 2005 when a referendum was held to vote for a newly drafted constitution. People across the divide felt that the national coalition was divided along ethnic lines. This saw the Luo, led by Raila Odinga, break away to form the Orange Democratic Movement.

The events that followed would see Kenya sink into a deep economic crisis as a result of the 2007 and 2008 general elections. The presidential elections were hotly contested between two main opponents, Mwai Kibaki and Raila Odinga with the latter disputing the results that had declared Mwai Kibaki as the winner. He insisted that they were marred by mass rigging, theft, and inconsistencies. This sparked what Kenyans would refer to as exemplifying Kenya as "a cradle of violence" as the elections plunged Kenya into a period of bloodshed and mass killings of innocent Kenyans. Animosity and enmity were at the peak across different ethnic divides. The observers, like the European Union, noted discrepancies in the election result, which raged fury in people of the Luo Community who were ardent Odinga supporters. This period saw vigilante groups like Mungiki, American Maine, and China Group clashing and terrorizing innocent civilians.

More than 1,300 people lost their lives and at least 650,000 others were displaced, making it the single most detrimental post-election skirmish in Kenya's history. The International Criminal Court then instituted charges of crimes against humanity and inciting to violence on six Kenyans, widely referred to as the "Ocampo Six", among them Uhuru Kenyatta and the then deputy president of Kenya William Ruto. The succeeding elections did not prove different. The general elections in Kenya in 2013 were bitterly contested by two rivals Uhuru Kenyatta of The National Unity and Raila Odinga of the Coalition of Reforms and Democracy. Uhuru was declared the winner, which Raila disputed due to the involvement of the Bio-metric Voter System, which he highlighted had drawbacks.  CORD was calling for reforms in the conduct of elections to be free and fair and challenged Uhuru's election in the Supreme Court, which later upheld Uhuru's election.

2017 saw the same contestants face each other in an election that was presumed predetermined by some factions with allegations that the electoral systems had been hacked. The Chief Technological Officer at the Independent Electoral and Boundaries Commission (IEBC), Chris Msando, was murdered in cold blood, in an occurrence that seemed like an assassination. Tension rose and the outcome of the election was disputed by the NASA coalition led by Raila Odinga and lawyers like Miguna Miguna, as they felt the electoral commission's systems were compromised and hacked.

The NASA Coalition proceeded to the Supreme Court to seek for the nullification of the elections. The apex court, led by chief justice David Maraga, agreed and declared the election null and void. A repeat election, held on 26 October 2017, was boycotted by the NASA coalition, leaving Kenyatta with an easy win by garnering 98% of the vote. There was a subsequent period of unrest, with Odinga staging a mock swearing-in ceremony and declaring himself as the People's President. This lead to warring factions between the supporters of Uhuru and Odinga followed by mass shootings in opposition areas in the slums and Kisumu.

These events gave rise to the March 9th handshake that brought together Uhuru Kenyatta and Raila Odinga.

The handshake 
On 9 March 2018, Kenyans woke to news that the key leaders, Raila Odinga and Uhuru Kenyatta, who were at the helm of the divisive politics and hurling insults at each other, were putting their differences aside and uniting through a "handshake". This was a public declaration to cease all hostilities and find a common ground in the interest of moving the country forward economically and politically. After a prolonged period of turmoil, Kenya was now up on its two feet.

However, politicians allied to The National Super Alliance (NASA) felt that this was betrayal as Odinga had not consulted them. Although a section of Kenyans perceived it as an act of leaders putting aside their personal interests for the country, there was an element of betrayal brought out by this sudden union in a section of others. It also sparked the 2022 presidential election campaign, with Raila now joining the government, potentially threatening Ruto's presidential.

Significance of the handshake 
Raila Odinga could now freely visit Uhuru Kenyatta, Gatundu while Uhuru Kenyatta could in Kisumu without any animosity from the locals.

On 20 October 2018, Odinga was appointed as African Union's High Representative for Infrastructure Development. It was speculated that the appointment was attributed to the renewed good relations between him and Uhuru, that might have made Uhuru tip him for the job. He effectively resigned from this position on 23 February 2023, citing "challenges to my continued availability for the role" and his desire "to pursue other pressing and urgent" issues. At the time, Odinga had planned (and already engaged in some) countrywide mass demonstrations and had, on 22 February 2023, issued a 14-day ultimatum for President William Ruto to act on alleged electoral injustice and the skyrocketing cost of living or face nationwide protests. 

Members of Parliament who had hostility against each other announced an end to the same, that is, Embakasi East Member of Parliament, Babu Owino and Starehe's Charles Njagua.

References 

Politics of Kenya
Electoral violence
2007 riots
2008 riots
2007 in Kenya
2008 in Kenya
Political riots
Conflicts in 2007
Conflicts in 2008
December 2007 events in Africa
January 2008 events in Africa
February 2008 events in Africa